Zirmanlu (also Romanized as Zīrmānlū; also known as Zarmānlū) is a village in Tala Tappeh Rural District, Nazlu District, Urmia County, West Azerbaijan Province, Iran. At the 2006 census, its population was 203, in 55 families.

References 

Populated places in Urmia County